Douglas Edwin Kertland (November 23, 1887 – March 4, 1982) was a Canadian architect and athlete. He was a rower who competed in the 1908 Summer Olympics. He was a coxswain of the Canadian boat, which won the bronze medal in the men's eight. He later became an architect and designed numerous buildings in Canada, and was a president of the Royal Architectural Institute of Canada (RAIC).

Born in Toronto, Kertland joined the army during the First World War and went overseas with the 126th Battalion. After the war, he studied architecture in England before returning to Toronto. Upon his return, he worked for John M. Lyle (whose most well-known project is the Royal Alexandra Theatre in Toronto). He established his own practice in Toronto in 1926. He designed numerous homes in the Rosedale neighbourhood of Toronto. He won a 1928 design competition and designed the Art Deco Automotive Building exhibition hall at Exhibition Place in Toronto. He designed many hospitals and banks in addition to office and residential buildings. Kertland was president of the RAIC in 1956 and 1958. He was also an honorary member of both the New Zealand Institute of Architects and the American Association of Architects.

He was married to Gladys McMurrich and, later, to May Warren Bray. In 1976, he donated the records of his architectural practices to the Archives of Ontario.

References

External links
Douglas Kertland's profile at databaseOlympics
Brief biography of Douglas Kertland
Douglas Kertland's profile at Sports Reference.com
Douglas Kertland fonds, Archives of Ontario

1887 births
1982 deaths
Canadian male rowers
Olympic bronze medalists for Canada
Olympic medalists in rowing
Medalists at the 1908 Summer Olympics
Olympic rowers of Canada
Rowers at the 1908 Summer Olympics
Rowers from Toronto